The women's javelin throw at the 2012 African Championships in Athletics was held at the Stade Charles de Gaulle on 30 June.

Medalists

Records

Schedule

Results

Final

References

Results

Javelin throw Women
Javelin throw at the African Championships in Athletics
2012 in women's athletics